Walter Black (1894 – 19 August 1959) was a member of the New Zealand Legislative Council from 8 September 1941 to 7 September 1948 and 8 September 1948 to 31 December 1950.

He was from Nelson. He was appointed by the First Labour Government.

References 

1894 births
1959 deaths
Members of the New Zealand Legislative Council
New Zealand Labour Party MLCs
People from Nelson, New Zealand
20th-century New Zealand politicians